Générations NC (GNC) is a political party in New Caledonia. It is led by Nicolas Metzdorf who is also the party's only Member of Parliament.

History
GNC was established by former members of Caledonia Together who had grown disillusioned with the party's course under Philippe Gomès and disagreed with its consideration of a tactical collaboration with pro-separatist parties in the South Province against  The Rally and Caledonian Republicans which they saw as a betrayal of Caledonia Together's anti-independence policy.

Politically, the GNC is a loyalist and anti-separatist party which supports maintaining New Caledonia's status as part of overseas France. It also calls for the No results of the 2018 and 2021 New Caledonian independence referendums to be respected. However, in contrast to the traditional stance of the more right-orientated anti-separatist movements, GNC describes itself as socially liberal and promotes a distinct New Caledonian multi-racial identity within the framework of French political administration in which all groups have equal rights. As such, it has sought to reach out to voters from all ethnic groups on the island. The party also supports environmental efforts to promote biodiversity and mitigate climate change.

References

See also 

 List of political parties in New Caledonia

Political parties in New Caledonia
Political parties established in 2019
Political parties of the French Fifth Republic